Harold A. Netland (born 1955), is a missionary educator turned academic.  He is the author or editor of nine books and many journal articles on the topic of religion and philosophy.

Career
Netland did his undergraduate work at Biola University and received his M.A. and Ph.D. from Claremont Graduate University. He worked in Japan for the Evangelical Free Church of America for nine years. In 1993 he moved back to the United States and joined Trinity Evangelical Divinity School as Professor of Philosophy of Religion and Intercultural Studies. He is the Director of the PhD/Intercultural Studies program at 'TEDS'.

From 2003 to 2006 Netland was a member of the Executive Committee of the Evangelical Philosophical Society.

Netland is considered an authority in the field of religious pluralism and is often quoted on such matters. Johnson quotes him in his article on John Hick's 'pluralism Hypothesis' - "To say that truth is propositional, then, is to recognize that although 'true' and 'truth' can be used in a variety of ways, in the logically basic sense truth is a quality or property of propositions. That is, truth is a property of propositions such that a proposition is true if and only if the state of affairs to which refers is as the proposition asserts it to be; otherwise it is false." When attempting to validate a position on Eastern Orthodox theology the author Adam Sparks makes reference to Netland work and expertise.

One of John Hick's former students and now established in his own right, Netland has taken a more critical stance of his erstwhile tutor's work. This critique can mainly be found with Netland's 2001 work Encountering Religious Pluralism: The Challenge to Christian Faith & Mission where he takes an evangelical position on Hick's proposals.

Works

Books

Articles and chapters

References

Living people
1955 births
American biblical scholars
Trinity International University faculty